Astragalus norvegicus is a species of flowering plant belonging to the family Fabaceae.

Its native range is Northern and Eastern Central Europe to Russian Far East and Mongolia.

Synonym:
 Astragalus subpolaris Boriss. & Schischk.

References

norvegicus